Jesus Gilberto Bernal (born November 1963) is a United States district judge of the United States District Court for the Central District of California.

Biography

Bernal received his Bachelor of Arts degree, cum laude, from Yale University in 1986. He received his Juris Doctor from Stanford Law School in 1989. He served as a law clerk to Judge David Vreeland Kenyon of the United States District Court for the Central District of California from 1989 to 1991. He worked as a litigation associate at the law firm of Heller, Ehrman, White & McAuliffe LLP in Los Angeles from 1991 to 1996, where he focused on complex civil litigation. Since 1996 he has been a Deputy Federal Public Defender in the Central District of California, serving at the Los Angeles office from 1996 to 2006 and serving as a Directing Attorney at the Riverside office from 2006 to 2012.

Federal judicial service

On April 25, 2012, President Barack Obama nominated Bernal to be a United States District Judge for the United States District Court for the Central District of California, to the seat vacated by Judge Stephen G. Larson. The Senate Judiciary Committee held a hearing on his nomination on June 6, 2012 and reported his nomination to the floor on July 12, 2012. The Senate confirmed Bernal in a voice vote on December 11, 2012.  He received his judicial commission on December 12, 2012.

See also
List of Hispanic/Latino American jurists

References

External links

1963 births
Living people
21st-century American judges
American judges of Mexican descent
American lawyers of Mexican descent
Judges of the United States District Court for the Central District of California
Hispanic and Latino American judges
Mexican emigrants to the United States
Public defenders
Stanford Law School alumni
United States district court judges appointed by Barack Obama
Yale College alumni